Ennu Swantham Koottukari is an Indian Malayalam television series which launched on Mazhavil Manorama. Janani, Soumya and Nila Raj play the lead roles in the series. The show telecasted its final episode on 10 July 2015 & got replaced by a new series, Vivahitha.

Synopsis 
The story revolves around the life and family of three lady friends, Ammu, Shwetha & Shamna. These three firm friends studied in the same college. The story highlights the life of these three friends, their relationships, their family.

Cast

Lead cast
  Janani as Ammu
 Soumya as Shamna
 Nila Raj as Shwetha
 Architha as Charulatha
 Dr.Sudheendran as Prof.Arun kumar
Pratheesh Nandha as Sanju

Supporting cast
 Beena Antony as Adv.Shivaranjini
Tony as Menon
Binil Khader as Dr.Sujith
Rajendran as Unnithan S.I
Anushree as Sabeena
Pria Menon as Roshni Chandran
Omana Ouseph as Swamini amma
Sharath Swamy
Saji Palamel
Seena as Remya
Pratheeksha G Pradeep
Pavithra
Lekshmi priya
Ayisha Rani as Doctor
Najim Arshad

References

External links

 

2014 Indian television series debuts
2014 Indian television series endings
Malayalam-language television shows
Mazhavil Manorama original programming